Genesis is the third studio album by Taiwanese Mandopop girl group S.H.E. It was released on 5 August 2002 by HIM International Music.

The track "美麗新世界" (Genesis) is listed at number 24 on Hit Fm Taiwan's Hit Fm Annual Top 100 Singles Chart (Hit-Fm年度百首單曲) for 2002.

Album information
Although the title track was an upbeat and lively number, S.H.E regarded it as their most difficult song at the time. While both Girls Dorm and Youth Society had songs that were sung entirely in English ("H.B.O" and "I've Never Been To Me", respectively), "Woman In Love", a cover of Rebekah Ryan's original in the Genesis album, would be the last English song that S.H.E would sing. In April 2003, eight months after the release of Genesis, actress Chen Mingzhen's "Thinking of Your Moment" (想你的瞬間) covered the same Sweetbox song as "Ocean of Love" (愛情的海洋). According to Chen, she recorded "Thinking of Your Moment" one year before S.H.E had put it on Genesis, but the only reason S.H.E managed to sing "Ocean of Love" first was because Chen was delayed by manufacturing problems.

Track listing

Music videos
The Genesis karaoke VCD was the first to feature music videos for every track; the trend would continue for each subsequent album. Despite choreographing every music video, only one track, "Where's Love", featured something resembling a plot, which depicted Ella's sadness and nostalgia after breaking up with her boyfriend and Selina and Hebe attempting to comfort her. "Fascination" was the last music video made for the album's karaoke VCD because it consisted of footage from S.H.E's N-age Concert in Tainan.

Charts

References

External links
  S.H.E discography@HIM International Music

2002 albums
S.H.E albums
HIM International Music albums